Climate of Peru describes the diverse climates of this large South American country with an area of . Peru is located entirely in the tropics but features desert and mountain climates as well as tropical rainforests. There are three main climatic regions: the Pacific Ocean coast is one of the driest deserts in the world but with some unique features; the high Andes mountains have a variety of microclimates depending on elevation and exposure and with temperatures and precipitation from temperate to polar and wet to dry; and the Amazon basin has tropical climates, mostly with abundant precipitation, along with sub-tropical climates in elevations above .

Pacific coastal desert

Three names are sometimes applied to the desert in different parts of the coastline. The Sechura Desert is in northern Peru. Southward is the Peruvian coastal desert which becomes at an indefinite location the Atacama Desert which continues into Chile.

The Sechura is warmer and less impacted by the cloud cover that characterizes the more southern parts of the coastal desert, but there is a uniformity in precipitation along the entire coastline with less than  annually. The desert strip along the Pacific is narrow, at its widest about  before the land climbs into the Andes and precipitation increases with elevation.

The following table summarizes climatic statistics for cities in the north, central, and southern parts of the coastal desert

A characteristic of the Peruvian coastal desert is low average temperatures despite its tropical latitudes. In the tropics the average annual temperature is usually at least  with little temperature variation among months. The relatively low temperatures of the Peruvian coastal desert are caused by the cold Humboldt Current. Ocean water temperatures in Lima in September, the coldest month, are as low as  similar to water temperatures near Los Angeles during its winter months.

The cold waters of the Humboldt Current also create a moist fog called garúa in Peru. The cold water, especially in the Southern Hemisphere's winter from May to November, cause an inversion, the air near the ocean surface being cooler than the air above, contrary to most climatic situations. In the Southern Hemisphere's summer from December to April, the weather is mostly sunny.

The moisturizing impact of the fog is increased by the high average humidity of the coastal deserts. For example, Lima has an average humidity of 84 percent, more than double the average humidity of most deserts. As a result of the fog, Lima gets only 1,230 hours of sunshine annually, and less than 50 hours each in the months of July, August, and September. By contrast, Seattle, not noted for its sunny weather, receives 2,170 hours of sunshine annually and "foggy London town" receives 1,618 hours.

As elevation increases moving inland from Lima and other coastal locations, so also does precipitation.

Apart from the irrigated agriculture in 57 river valleys coming down from the Andes and passing through the desert en route to the ocean, the coastal desert is almost without vegetation. In a few favored locations, where mountains come close to the sea and the fog condenses on the mountain slopes, the garúa permits vegetation to thrive in "fog oases," called lomas in Peru. Scholars have described individual lomas as "an island of vegetation in a virtual ocean of desert."

Andean highlands

The Andes, with elevations almost entirely above  and mostly above , rise above the desert to the west and the tropical rain forest to the east. The mountain climates are cool, often cold, with varied precipitation depending upon exposure. In general the western slopes of the Andres, facing the Pacific Ocean, are drier than the eastern slopes. Beginning at latitude 8.64° S and continuing southward are many snow-capped and glaciated peaks more that  in elevation.

The temperature decline with increasing elevation is less than the average on the Pacific coast side of the Andes because of the unusually low temperature of the fog-bound coast. The steep slopes and the sharp changes in elevation result in a large number of microclimates in which a change of location of a few kilometres can result in major climatic changes. The common precipitation regime of the Andes is a rainy summer season from October to April and a dry winter from May to September. The city of Puno at that elevation has snow 14 days per year on average and it has snowed in every month of the year except November.

The following table summarizes climatic statistics for cities in the Andes mountain region.

The indigenous peoples of Peru have been farming in the Andes for thousands of years despite the severe climatic limitations.

Amazon rainforest

The Amazon rainforest region comprises about 60 percent of the total area of Peru and is characterized, as is the coast, by its climatic uniformity: hot average temperatures with little variation among the seasons and abundant precipitation. While there are locations that fit into all three of the Köppen tropical types of climate, Af, Am, and Aw, the differences among the three climates in Peru are small. The true tropical rainforest (Af) climate requires at least  precipitation in all months of the year. Pucallpa (Am) has only one month that falls below that threshold; Puerto Esperanza (Aw) has three months below the Af threshold. The driest months are in the Southern Hemisphere's winter of June through August.

The dividing line between the Amazon and Andean climates is uncertain, but depends mostly on elevation. Temperatures become cooler with elevation and around  elevation the climate becomes sub-tropical rather than tropical, a climate often characterized as "eternal spring." In Oxapampa, Cfb under the Köppen classification, temperatures rarely fall below  or rise above  and rain is abundant year-round. A few locations at elevations similar to Oxapampa have a pronounced dry season and are classified as Cwb (sub-tropical highland with a dry winter), rather than Cfb.

The following table summarizes climatic statistics for cities and towns in the Amazon rainforest region.

El Niño

El Niño (the "boy child") and La Niña (the "girl child") are the manifestations of the El Niño–Southern Oscillation which influences weather around the world, but especially near the coasts of northern Peru and southern Ecuador. The warm phase, El Niño, occurs every two to seven years. Ocean temperatures on the coast of Peru increase by as much as  during the Southern Hemisphere's summer, beginning about Christmas, the name El Niño referring to the birth of Jesus. El Niño brings warmer and sunnier weather to the coasts of Peru than normal. In especially impactful years, as occurred in 1982–1983, 1997–1998, and 2015–2017, El Niño causes heavy rainfall in coastal northern Peru in what is a desert that rarely receives any rain at all. Floods and landslides (huaycos) are the consequence; the warm water reduces fishing catches; and the southern Andes of Peru suffer reduced precipitation.

Global warming
Climatic statistics cited in this article are for the period 1982-2012 and may become inaccurate in the future because of climate change and global warming. Extreme weather events, including drought and flood, are anticipated to become more frequent.

The most immediately visible problem of climatic change in Peru is the melting of glaciers in the Andes. Peru is home to 71 percent of the world's tropical glaciers and since 1970 glacial volume has decreased by 40 percent. Many areas of Peru depend upon glacial melt for water for consumption, irrigation, and industry. In the Cordillera Blanca, for example, glacial melt provides 80 percent of water in the rivers during the dry season and 4-8 percent during the rainy season. The consequence of increased glacial melt is floods during the wet season and less water in rivers during the dry season. The desert coast of Peru has 52 percent of Peru's population on 12 percent of its land area and is especially vulnerable to fluctuations in its water supply, nearly all of which comes from rivers originating in the Andes. Accelerated glacial melt and the eventual disappearance of glaciers will severely impact the quantity of water available in the coastal and mountain regions.

References

Peru
Geography of Peru
Montane ecology